Orgelbau Pieringer is an Austrian organ building company based in the city of Haag in Lower Austria. The founder and owner of the company is the Haag organ builder Johann Pieringer. Orgelbau Pieringer is a reputable organ workshop active for 25 years throughout Austria, Germany and Croatia, as well as a member of International Society of Organbuilders.

History 
After completing his professional training as an organ builder in a master workshop in Sankt Florian (Upper Austria) and successfully passing the final apprenticeship examination (1982) as well as master's examination (1989) for the organ building, Johann Pieringer set up his own business in 1996 and founded his organ workshop in the city of Haag. In 2003 the new workshop was built in Haag and the company headquarters moved from Johannesgasse to Holzleiten.

Orgelbau Pieringer mainly builds positive, house, concert and church organs designed in the classic mechanical manner of construction. Other services of the company also include cleaning and reconstruction, restoration of historical organs, intonation and tuning adapted to the organ's style and location, maintenance, organ relocation and transport as well as harmonium repairs. The company mostly operates throughout Austria, but has also realized some significant projects in Germany and Croatia, such as the construction of the organ in the choir chapel of the Frauenchiemsee monastery, the organ in the chapel of the Society of the Sisters of Our Lady in Zagreb and the organ in the parish church of Our Lady of Loreto in Zadar.

Works (selection) 
P = Pedal keyboard

Awards and honors 
 2007 – Ausbilder-Trophy 2007, 3rd prize for the training of apprentices in the fields of business and entrepreneurship.
 2007 – nomination for the Austrian Adolf Loos Prize for the »Klangwürfel« organ project.
 2014 – Austrian Maecenas Prize in the category Best Cultural Sponsorship of Small and Medium-Sized Enterprises for the financing of the concert series "Orgelkunst 2013" at Ybbs an der Donau.

References

External links 

 Official website of Orgelbau Pieringer (in German)
 Organ index.de − Pieringer, Johann (in German)
 Austrian Economic Chambers – WKO Firmen A-Z: Orgelbau Pieringer e.U. (in German)

Pieringer
Pieringer
Pieringer
Pieringer
Economy of Lower Austria